The Trade (Slavonic) Side, or Half is a historical district of Veliky Novgorod, located on the right bank ("side") of Volkhov. It got its name from the Torg (city market) located on it. The other half was called the Sophia Side after the St. Sophia Cathedral.

From the 10th to the 12th centuries, the Slavonic End of Novgorod was located on the Trade Side. In the 12th century, the Plotnitsky (Carpenters's) End separated from the Slavonic End, and since then the Trade Side consisted of two Novgorod ends.

The Trade Side began to be populated since the 10th century and the marketplace (Torg) appeared there. In the 11th century Yaroslav's Court, the princely residence, was built on this side as well.

Sources

Veliky Novgorod
History of Veliky Novgorod